Olin Guy Blackwell (February 15, 1915 – March 7, 1986) was an American lawman who was the fourth and final warden of Alcatraz Federal Penitentiary, which was situated on Alcatraz Island, California. Associate Warden to Paul J. Madigan from April 1959, Blackwell served as warden of Alcatraz at its most difficult time from 1961 to 1963, when it was facing closure as a decaying prison and financing problems and at the time of the June 1962 escape. At that time, he was on vacation in Lake Berryessa in Napa County, California, and he didn't believe the men could have survived the waters and make it to shore. 

The prison closed on March 21, 1963. Blackwell was considered to have been the least strict warden of Alcatraz, perhaps in part due to him having been a heavy drinker and smoker, nicknamed "Gypsy" and known as "Blackie" to his friends. He was said to have been an excellent marksman. He had earlier served as Associate Warden of Lewisburg Federal Penitentiary. He died on March 7, 1986, in Hart County Georgia.

References

American prison wardens
Wardens of Alcatraz Federal Penitentiary
1915 births
1986 deaths